Yaw Mingyi Monastery is a Buddhist monastery in Mandalay, Burma, built in 1866 under the patronage of Pho Hlaing, the Yaw Mingyi. Unlike classic Burmese monasteries, the Yaw Mingyi Monastery was a brick monastery modeled after a hotel the Yaw Mingyi had seen while traveling in Southern Italy, and as such, adopts European flourishes and is extravagantly carved in plaster. It was located near the Salin Monastery. The monastery was burned down all wooden infrastructure, remained only brick structure during World War II during the Allied bombing of Mandalay.

See also
Kyaung
Atumashi Monastery
Myadaung Monastery
Salin Monastery
Shwenandaw Monastery
Taiktaw Monastery

References

Monasteries in Myanmar
Buddhist temples in Mandalay
19th-century Buddhist temples
Religious buildings and structures completed in 1866
1866 establishments in Burma